Thomas William Runnells (born April 17, 1955) is an American former infielder, coach and manager in Major League Baseball.

Biography
Runnells attended the University of Northern Colorado and originally signed with the San Francisco Giants. He played parts of two seasons (1985–86) with the Cincinnati Reds, appearing in 40 games and batting .174 in 46 at bats without a home run or run batted in. He was a switch hitter who threw right-handed. In 1989, his Indianapolis Indians won the American Association championship and the "AAA Classic", earning him a promotion to a coaching position with the parent Montreal Expos.

On June 2, 1991, he was promoted again to manager of the Expos, who were lodged in last place in the National League East Division after 49 games.  His time as Expos manager was short but tumultuous. Succeeding the very popular Buck Rodgers, he had trouble establishing his credibility with the media and the team. He was General Manager Dave Dombrowski's hand-picked man but failed to replicate his minor league success as the Expos finished the 1991 season in last place for the first time since 1976.

He then proceeded to try to shake up the team through various moves.  Most notably, he shifted three-time Gold Glove winner Tim Wallach from third base to first base in order to clear a spot in the lineup for recently promoted prospect Bret Barberie.  Although Runnells was harshly criticized for moving the popular Wallach, the move appeared to make some sense at the time. Barberie had seen time at all four infield positions while in the minors.  However, he was blocked from second base (his best position) by Delino DeShields, didn't have the range to play shortstop, and wasn't physically capable of playing first base.  Wallach was 33 years old and his best years appeared to be behind him, so it appeared logical to ease the transition by moving him to first and putting Barberie at third.  However, both players got off to sluggish starts in April.

With a career major league managing record of 68-81 (.456), Runnells then returned to minor league baseball, managing in the farm systems of the Detroit Tigers and the Colorado Rockies.  In the spring of 1995, Runnells managed the Tigers replacement players in spring training during the 1994–95 Major League Baseball strike.

On May 29, 2009. Runnells was promoted to Bench Coach of the Colorado Rockies when manager Clint Hurdle was fired and bench coach Jim Tracy replaced him. He retired from the Rockies after the 2016 season.

Managerial statistics

References

External links

Tom Runnells at Pura Pelota (Venezuelan Professional Baseball League)

1955 births
Living people
Colorado Rockies (baseball) coaches
Cincinnati Reds players
Montreal Expos coaches
Montreal Expos managers
Detroit Tigers scouts
Colorado Springs Sky Sox managers
Major League Baseball infielders
Baseball players from Colorado
Chattanooga Lookouts managers
Major League Baseball bench coaches
Denver Zephyrs players
Shreveport Captains players
Fresno Giants players
Phoenix Giants players
Great Falls Giants players
Wichita Aeros players
Leones del Caracas players
American expatriate baseball players in Venezuela
Indianapolis Indians managers
Toledo Mud Hens managers
Trenton Thunder managers
Northern Colorado Bears baseball players